Mark Robert Buttigieg (born 11 June 1966) is an Australian politician and trade unionist. He was elected to the New South Wales Legislative Council for the Australian Labor Party at the 2019 New South Wales state election.

Early life
Buttigieg was born in Sydney to Maltese parents Victor and Carmen who immigrated to Australia from Malta in the 1950s. He holds an arts degree in political science and an economics degree with first-class honours. He also has a certificate in electrical engineering and an electrical trade certificate. Before entering politics, he worked for Ausgrid as an electrical system operator. He was also an organiser for the Electrical Trades Union of Australia (ETU) and a councillor on the Sutherland Shire council.

Politics
Buttigieg stood for the ALP in the Division of Cook at the 2004 and 2007 federal elections. He was elected to the New South Wales Legislative Council at the 2019 New South Wales state election.

References

Living people
Members of the New South Wales Legislative Council
Australian Labor Party members of the Parliament of New South Wales
Australian electricians
Australian trade unionists
Australian people of Maltese descent
1966 births
21st-century Australian politicians